Moorland Prison refers to a pair of prisons located in Hatfield Woodhouse, South Yorkshire, England. The prisons are jointly managed, and are operated by Her Majesty's Prison Service:

 Moorland Closed (HM Prison), a Category C prison and Young Offenders Institution (renamed Moorland (HM Prison) in 2010)
 Moorland Open (HM Prison), a Category D prison and Young Offenders Institution (renamed Hatfield (HM Prison) in 2010)